Javier "Javi" Ontiveros Parra (born 9 September 1997) is a Spanish professional footballer who plays mainly as a right winger for Villarreal CF B.

Club career
Born in Marbella, Málaga, Andalusia, Ontiveros joined Málaga CF's youth setup in 2010, after spells at CD Vázquez Cultural and Real Betis. On 24 June 2015, without even appearing for the reserves, he was called up by manager Javi Gracia for the pre-season with the main squad.

Ontiveros made his debut as a senior on 22 August 2015, coming on as a second-half substitute in a 2–0 away win against CD Comarca del Mármol in the Tercera División. He scored his first senior goal on 13 September, netting the last in a 2–0 home success over CD Rincón. He scored a brace in a 3–0 win at CD Español del Alquián on 31 October.

On 21 November 2015, Ontiveros made his first-team – and La Liga – debut, replacing Arthur Boka in a 0–2 away loss against RCD Espanyol. He only appeared in four league matches during the campaign, all from the bench, but scored 11 goals for the B-team in the fourth division.

On 19 October 2016, Ontiveros scored once and provided two assists for Malaga's U19 team in a 5–0 UEFA Youth League home routing of FC Nitra. He made his first appearance of the 2016–17 season on 4 November 2016, in a 3–2 win against Sporting de Gijón; coming on in the 57th minute, he assisted Sandro Ramírez in the team's second goal eight minutes later. On 26 November he scored his first professional goal, netting a last-minute winner in a 4–3 home success over Deportivo de La Coruña.

On 31 January 2018, Ontiveros was loaned to Segunda División side Real Valladolid until the end of the season. He helped the club win promotion to the top tier in the play-offs, and subsequently returned to his parent club, now also in the second division.

On 20 August 2019, Ontiveros signed a five-year contract with Villarreal CF. On 24 September of the following year, after being mainly used as a substitute, he moved to fellow league team SD Huesca on loan for one year.

On 27 August 2021, Ontiveros moved to CA Osasuna also in the top tier, on loan for the 2021–22 campaign. His loan was terminated on 29 January 2022, and he signed a permanent four-and-a-half-year contract with CF Fuenlabrada in the second division just hours later; Villarreal also retained a buy-back clause. Ultimately, his contract has changed into a six-month loan until his return to Villarreal.

Career statistics

Club

References

External links
Málaga official profile 

1997 births
Living people
People from Marbella
Sportspeople from the Province of Málaga
Footballers from Andalusia
Spanish footballers
Association football wingers
La Liga players
Segunda División players
Tercera División players
Atlético Malagueño players
Málaga CF players
Real Valladolid players
Villarreal CF players
SD Huesca footballers
CA Osasuna players
CF Fuenlabrada footballers
Spain youth international footballers